Isaac B. Van Houten (June 4, 1776 – August 16, 1850) was an American politician who served one term as a U.S. Representative from New York from 1833 to 1835.

Biography
Born in Clarkstown (now New City), Rockland County, New York, Van Houten attended the common schools.

He engaged in milling and agricultural pursuits.

Political career 
He served as member of the State assembly 1833–1835.

Van Houten was elected as a Jacksonian to the Twenty-third Congress (March 4, 1833 – March 3, 1835).

Later career and death 
He resumed his former business pursuits.

He died in Clarkstown (now New City), New York, August 16, 1850.
He was interred in the family burying ground on his estate near Clarkstown.

References

1776 births
1850 deaths
American people of Dutch descent
Jacksonian members of the United States House of Representatives from New York (state)
19th-century American politicians
People from New City, New York

Members of the United States House of Representatives from New York (state)